Isidore is a male given name.

Isidore or Isador may refer to:

In arts and entertainment
 Isidore, a band composed of Steve Kilbey of The Church and Jeffrey Cain, formerly of Remy Zero
 "Isidore", a song on the album If Not Now, When? by Incubus
 Jack Isidore, protagonist of Philip K. Dick's novel Confessions of a Crap Artist
 John R. Isidore, a fictional character in Philip K. Dick's novel Do Androids Dream of Electric Sheep?

Other uses
 Hurricane Isidore (disambiguation)
 Isidore (platform), is a web-based platform dedicated to the sharing of scientific knowledge in human and social sciences. 
 Isadore Nabi, pseudonym used by a group of scientists
 Isadore, Michigan, a small unincorporated community in Centerville Township, Michigan

See also
 Isadora (disambiguation)
 St. Isidore (disambiguation)
 Isidoro, a given name and surname
 Isidoro, nom de guerre of Felipe González (born 1942), socialist leader in Franco-era Spain